Harpadon erythraeus is a species of lizardfish that live mainly in the Western Indian Ocean.

References
 

Synodontidae
Taxa named by Wolfgang Klausewitz
Fish described in 1983